Perkinstown is an unincorporated community located in the town of Grover, Taylor County, Wisconsin, United States.

History
Logging began in the area around the 1860s. The first homesteaders staked their claims nearby in 1882. In 1892 Shaws started a leather tannery in Perkinstown, using hemlock bark from the surrounding forests, and for a time dumping the waste sludge in Kathryn Lake. By 1893 the town had six saloons. In 1900 the tannery shut down. In 1933 the Perkinstown CCC Camp opened nearby, and helped build the Winter Sports Area, among other projects.

References

Further reading
 More details on history are in Mary Schultz's compilation, in the references above.

Unincorporated communities in Taylor County, Wisconsin
Unincorporated communities in Wisconsin